Georges Vitaly, real name Vitali Garcouchenko, (15 January 1917 – 2 January 2007), was a 20th-century French actor, theater director and theater manager.

The son of immigrants from the Russian revolution, he trained as actor from 1934. In 1947, he won the concours des jeunes compagnies with Le Mal court by Jacques Audiberti with Suzanne Flon.
In 1947 he founded the Théâtre de la Huchette which he directed until 1952. Then, from 1954 to 1970, he was director of the Théâtre La Bruyère, in Paris. From 1970 to 1975, he was director of the Maison de la culture in Nantes.

He was married to the comedian Monique Delaroche.

Filmography

Cinema 
 1959: La Nuit des espions by Robert Hossein
 1960: Les Canailles by Maurice Labro 
 1964: L'Enfer by Henri-Georges Clouzot (unfinished)

Television 
 1970: La Hobereaute (spoken opera by Jacques Audiberti), directed by Georges Vitaly, en différé de l'Hôtel de Sully dans le cadre du Festival du Marais, TV director Philippe Laïk
 1970: The Moods of Marianne by Alfred de Musset
 1981: Le Petit Théâtre d'Antenne 2 : Un dirigeable ensorcelé by André Halimi, TV direction

Au théâtre ce soir 
Director
 1970 : Cherchez le corps, Mister Blake by Frank Launder, Sidney Gilliat, TV director Pierre Sabbagh, Théâtre Marigny
 1976 : La Sainte Famille by André Roussin, TV director Pierre Sabbagh, Théâtre Édouard VII
 1976 : Le monsieur qui attend by Emlyn Williams, TV director Pierre Sabbagh, Théâtre Édouard VII
 1977 : Appelez-moi maître by Renée and Gabriel Arout, TV director Pierre Sabbagh, Théâtre Marigny 
 1978 : Une femme trop honnête by Armand Salacrou, TV director Pierre Sabbagh, théâtre Marigny
 1979 : Good Bye Charlie by George Axelrod, adaptation Pierre Barillet and Jean-Pierre Gredy, réalisation Pierre Sabbagh, Théâtre Marigny 
 1980 : La Claque by André Roussin, TV director Pierre Sabbagh, Théâtre Marigny 
 1981 : La Quadrature du cercle by Valentin Kataev, TV director Pierre Sabbagh, Théâtre Marigny 
 1984 : Un parfum de miel by Éric Westphal, TV director Pierre Sabbagh, Théâtre Marigny 
 1984 : Pomme, pomme, pomme by Jacques Audiberti, TV director Pierre Sabbagh, Théâtre Marigny

Theatre

Comedian 
 1944: Hyménée by Nikolai Gogol, directed by Pierre Valde, Théâtre du Vieux-Colombier
 1945: Caligula by Albert Camus, directed by Paul Œttly, Théâtre Hébertot 
 1947: Le Mal court by Jacques Audiberti, directed by Georges Vitaly, Théâtre Charles de Rochefort, Théâtre de Poche
 1947: Les Amants de Noël by Pierre Barillet, directed by Pierre Valde, théâtre de Poche
 1948: La Fête noire by Jacques Audiberti, directed by Georges Vitaly, Théâtre de la Huchette
 1949: La Quadrature du cercle by Valentin Kataev, directed by Georges Vitaly, Théâtre de la Huchette
 1951: Monsieur Bob'le by Georges Schehadé, directed by Georges Vitaly, Théâtre de la Huchette
 1960: L'Homme à l'ombrelle blanche by Charles Charras, directed by Georges Vitaly, Poche Montparnasse

Theatre director 

 1945: La Cinquantaine by Georges Courteline, L’Anniversaire de la fondation and Une noce by Anton Chekhov, Théâtre de Poche
 1946: Les Pères ennemis by Charles Vildrac, Théâtre Édouard VII
 1947: Le Mal court by Jacques Audiberti, Théâtre Charles de Rochefort, Théâtre de Poche, Comédie des Champs-Élysées, Théâtre des Noctambules 
 1947: Les Épiphanies by Henri Pichette, Théâtre des Noctambules
 1948: Le Sang clos by René Maurice Picard, Théâtre de la Huchette
 1948: La Fête noire by Jacques Audiberti, Théâtre de la Huchette
 1949: Les Indifférents by Odilon-Jean Périer, Théâtre de la Huchette
 1949: Les Taureaux by Alexandre Arnoux, Théâtre de la Huchette
 1949: La Quadrature du cercle by Valentin Kataev, Théâtre de la Huchette
 1950: Pépita by Henri Fontenille and Maurice Chevit, Théâtre de la Huchette
 1950: Pucelle by Jacques Audiberti, Théâtre de la Huchette
 1951: La Belle Rombière by Jean Clervers & , Théâtre de la Huchette, Théâtre de l'Œuvre
 1951: Edmée by Pierre-Aristide Bréal, Théâtre de la Huchette
 1951: Monsieur Bob'le by Georges Schehadé, Théâtre de la Huchette
 1952: Médée by Robinson Jeffers, Théâtre Montparnasse
 1952: Les Taureaux by Alexandre Arnoux, Théâtre Montparnasse
 1952: La Petite Femme de Loth by Tristan Bernard, Théâtre Montparnasse
 1952: A Flea in Her Ear by Georges Feydeau, Théâtre Montparnasse 
 1952: La Farce des ténébreux by Michel de Ghelderode, Théâtre du Grand-Guignol
 1952: Les Barbes nobles by André Roussin, Théâtre du Grand-Guignol
 1953: La Délaissée by Max Maurey, 
 1953: Crime parfait by Frederick Knott, Théâtre des Ambassadeurs
 1953: Du plomb pour ces demoiselles by Frédéric Dard, Théâtre du Grand-Guignol 
 1953: L'Énigme de la chauve-souris by Mary Roberts Rinehart, Théâtre du Grand-Guignol
 1953: Les Naturels du Bordelais by Jacques Audiberti, Théâtre La Bruyère
 1953: La Danseuse et le comédien by Claude Schnerb, Théâtre La Bruyère
 1954: A Flea in Her Ear by Georges Feydeau, Théâtre des Célestins
 1954: Crime parfait by Frederick Knott, Théâtre de l'Ambigu
 1954: Les Mystères de Paris by Albert Vidalie after Eugène Sue, Théâtre La Bruyère
 1954: Si jamais je te pince !... by Eugène Labiche, Théâtre La Bruyère
 1955: Lady 213 by Jean Guitton, Théâtre de la Madeleine
 1955: Doit-on le dire ? by Eugène Labiche, Théâtre La Bruyère
 1955: Un cas intéressant by Dino Buzzati, adaptation Albert Camus, Théâtre La Bruyère
 1955: Monsieur et Mesdames Kluck by Germaine Lefrancq, Théâtre La Bruyère
 1955: Le Mal court by Jacques Audiberti, Théâtre La Bruyère
 1955: Ce diable d'ange by Pierre Destailles and Charles Michel, Comédie-Wagram
 1956: Le Prince endormi by Terence Rattigan, Théâtre de la Madeleine
 1957: Une femme trop honnête by Armand Salacrou, Théâtre Édouard VII
 1957: La Petite Femme de Loth by Tristan Bernard, Théâtre La Bruyère
 1957: Hibernatus by Jean Bernard-Luc, Théâtre de l'Athénée
 1957: The Taming of the Shrew by William Shakespeare, Théâtre de l'Athénée 
 1957: La terre est basse by Alfred Adam, Théâtre La Bruyère
 1957: Les Taureaux by Alexandre Arnoux, Théâtre La Bruyère 
 1958: Le Ouallou by Jacques Audiberti, Théâtre La Bruyère
 1958: Le Chinois by Pierre Barillet and Jean-Pierre Gredy, Théâtre La Bruyère
 1958: Don Juan by Henry de Montherlant, Théâtre de l'Athénée
 1958: Le Système Ribadier by Georges Feydeau, Théâtre La Bruyère
 1958: Le Serment d'Horace by Henry Murger, Théâtre La Bruyère
 1958: La Petite Femme de Loth by Tristan Bernard, Théâtre La Bruyère
 1959: L'Effet Glapion by Jacques Audiberti, Théâtre La Bruyère
 1959: Edmée by Pierre-Aristide Bréal, Théâtre La Bruyère 
 1960: Le Mariage de Monsieur Mississippi by Friedrich Dürrenmatt, Théâtre La Bruyère
 1960: L'Homme à l'ombrelle blanche by Charles Charras, Poche Montparnasse
 1961: Monsieur chasse ! by Georges Feydeau, Théâtre La Bruyère
 1961: Le Rêveur by Jean Vauthier, Théâtre La Bruyère
 1962: Frank V by Friedrich Dürrenmatt, Théâtre national de Belgique
 1962: Irma la douce by Alexandre Breffort and Marguerite Monnot
 1962: Catharsis de Michel Parent, Festival des nuits de Bourgogne Dijon
 1962: Pomme, pomme, pomme by Jacques Audiberti, Théâtre La Bruyère
 1962: La Queue du diable by Yves Jamiaque, Théâtre La Bruyère
 1962: Cherchez le corps, Mister Blake by Frank Launder and Sidney Gilliat, Théâtre La Bruyère
 1963: Les Passions contraires by Georges Soria, Théâtre La Bruyère  
 1963: Le Mal court by Jacques Audiberti, Théâtre La Bruyère
 1963: Les Rustres by Carlo Goldoni, Pays-Bas
 1964: 2+2=2 by Staf Knop, Théâtre La Bruyère
 1964: Marie Stuart by Friedrich von Schiller, Festival des nuits de Bourgogne
 1965: El Greco by Luc Vilsen, Théâtre du Vieux-Colombier
 1966: Le Mal court by Jacques Audiberti, Tréteaux de France
 1966: Eris de Lee Falk, Théâtre La Bruyère
 1966: Le Grand Cérémonial by Fernando Arrabal, Théâtre des Mathurins
 1966: Mêlées et démêlées by Eugène Ionesco, Théâtre La Bruyère
 1966: La Fête noire by Jacques Audiberti, Festival du Marais Hôtel de Sully, Théâtre La Bruyère
 1967: Un parfum de fleurs by James Saunders, Théâtre La Bruyère
 1967: Les Caprices de Marianne by Alfred de Musset, Festival des Nuits de Bourgogne, Festival du Languedoc      
 1968: Quoat-Quoat by Jacques Audiberti, Théâtre La Bruyère
 1968: Le Mal court by Jacques Audiberti, Tréteaux de France, tournée au Moyen-orient Égypte, Liban, Turquie)
 1969: Guerre et paix au café Sneffle by Rémo Forlani, Théâtre La Bruyère
 1969: La Fête noire by Jacques Audiberti, Théâtre La Bruyère
 1969: la Hobereaute by Jacques Audiberti, Hôtel de Sully
 1970: Des pommes pour Ève by Gabriel Arout, Théâtre La Bruyère
 1970: Caligula by Albert Camus, Théâtre La Bruyère, Théâtre Graslin 
 1970: The Resistible Rise of Arturo Ui by Bertolt Brecht, Maison de la Culture de Nantes
 1971: La Logeuse by Jacques Audiberti, Théâtre La Bruyère
 1971: Vézelay la colline éternelle son et lumière, text Maurice Druon
 1972: L'Ingénu d'Auteuil by Jean Le Marois, Théâtre La Bruyère
 1972: The Brothers Karamazov by Fyodor Dostoyevsky, Théâtre Graslin
 1973: Série blême by Boris Vian, Théâtre de Boulogne-Billancourt
 1973: Le Dernier des métiers by Boris Vian, Maison de la Culture de Nantes
 1974: Le Barbier de Séville by Beaumarchais, Maison de la Culture de Nantes
 1975: Deux sur la Tamise by Sophie Darbon, Théâtre La Bruyère
 1978: Punk et Punk et Colégram by Fernando Arrabal, Théâtre du Lucernaire
 1979: La Baignoire by Victor Haïm, Théâtre du Lucernaire
 1979: Série blême by Boris Vian, Théâtre du Lucernaire
 1980 : Pétrolimonade de Max Naldini, Théâtre Beaubourg
 1980: Juin 40 by Pierre Bourgeade, Théâtre du Lucernaire
 1981: Le Merveilleux Complet couleur glace à la noix de coco by Ray Bradbury, Chateauvallon
 1981: Faut pas faire cela tout seul, David Mathel de Serge Ganzl, Théâtre du Lucernaire
 1981: Le Roi des balcons by Jean-Jacques Varoujean, Théâtre du Coupe-Chou Beaubourg
 1982: Un parfum de miel by Eric Westphal, Théâtre du Lucernaire
 1982: Le Mal court by Jacques Audiberti, Théâtre du Tourtour
 1984: Ubu enchaîné by Alfred Jarry, Théâtre du Lucernaire
 1985: La Fête noire by Jacques Audiberti, Théâtre du Lucernaire
 1986: Le Mal court by Jacques Audiberti, Théâtre Mouffetard
 1989: Flüchtlingsgespräche  by Bertolt Brecht, Théâtre du Lucernaire 
 1989: Le Dépôt des locomotives by Michel Diaz, Théâtre Mouffetard
 1991: Les Patients by Jacques Audiberti, Petit Montparnasse 
 1991: Amours et jalousies by Molière, maison Armande Béjart Meudon
 1995: La Société des Alloqués by Guy Foissy, Théâtre du Lucernaire

Prizes and honours 
 2002 : Prix du Brigadier : Brigadier d'honneur for all of his career.

Biography 
 Maquillage de théâtre de Georges Vitaly, 1947
 En toute vitalyté : 50 ans de théâtre de Georges Vitaly, Éditions Nizet, 1995
 Le Fabuleux Roman du théâtre de la Huchette de Gonzague Phélip, Gallimard, 2007
 Malva, Éditions Alna, 2005.

External links 
 
  Les Archives du Spectacle

French theatre managers and producers
French male actors
French theatre directors
1917 births
Ukrainian emigrants to France
2007 deaths